Robert Butt (born 27 March 1946) is an English former professional footballer who played as a winger. He made appearances in the English Football League with Wrexham.

References

1946 births
Living people
English footballers
Association football wingers
Wrexham A.F.C. players
Ellesmere Port Town F.C. players
English Football League players